Guria is a region (mkhare) in Georgia, in the western part of the country, bordered by the eastern end of the Black Sea. The region has a population of 113,000 (2016), with Ozurgeti as the regional capital.

Geography

Guria is bordered by Samegrelo to the north-west, Imereti to the north, Samtskhe-Javakheti to the east, Ajaria to the south, and the Black Sea to the west.

Guria is traversed by the northeasterly line of equal latitude and longitude.

Administrative divisions

Guria is divided into 4 entities (3 municipalities and 1 city), including :

 City of Ozurgeti
 Ozurgeti Municipality
 Lanchkhuti Municipality
 Chokhatauri Municipality

History

The territory that is now Guria was part of the kingdom of Colchis, best known in the West for the tale of the Golden Fleece. Following the collapse of the Colchian Kingdom it became part of the Kingdom of Lazica in the first century BC. In antiquity the area was a significant source of iron, as early as the fifth century BC, and also copper and gold.

The toponym "Guria" is first attested in the c. 800 Georgian chronicle of Pseudo-Juansher.

Guria first appears c. 1352 as a fief of the house of Vardanidze-Dadiani; and after 1463 it became a sovereign principality independent of the Kingdom of Georgia under a branch of that house, known thereafter by the name of Gurieli. The principality, comprising modern Guria and much of Adjara with the city of Batumi, was subsequently reduced in size and devastated in a series of conflicts with the Ottoman Empire. A Russian protectorate was established by the treaty concluded on June 19, 1810 between Mamia V Gurieli and the empire, and in 1829, during the regency for the last prince, the Gurieli David, the principality was annexed by Russia.

There were uprisings against Russian rule in 1819 and again in 1841. In 1840, Guria was made a county (uyezd) and renamed Ozurgeti, after one of its main towns. In 1846, it was transferred to the new Kutais Governorate. It was the most ethnically homogenous of Georgian areas, with the peasantry and lesser rural nobility making up almost the entire population, with a high level of literacy and a relatively high degree of economic self-satisfaction. The peasant protest movement, which originated in 1902 and culminated in an open insurrection against the government during the Russian Revolution of 1905, was the most effective and organized peasant movement in the empire. The peasants’ self-government, the so-called Gurian Republic, survived into 1906, when it was crushed and Guria devastated by the Cossack punitive expedition. The region was a native powerbase of the Georgian Social Democratic (Menshevik) Party which dominated the Democratic Republic of Georgia from 1918 to 1921. Guria was a scene of guerrilla resistance to the militarily imposed Soviet rule early in the 1920s. Under the Soviet government, Guria was an agrarian area divided into three administrative districts. In 1995, the Georgian government decreed the creation of the region (mkhare) of Guria, restoring the province's historical name to official usage.

The Orthodox churches of Likhauri and Shemokmedi are the main historical buildings in the province.

Etymology

 The linguistic evidence for the above hypothesis is the Megrelian word for “heart” – “guri” (Georgian: “guli”).

Economy
Subtropic farming and tourism are a mainstay of the region's economy. Water is one of Guria's main assets. The province is famous for the mineral water of Nabeglavi, which is similar to Borjomi in its chemical composition, and the Black Sea health resort of Ureki, which is rich in magnetic sand. Guria is also one of the largest tea growing regions in Georgia.

Demographics

Ethnic and religious groups
According to the 2014 census, Guria has a population of 113.350 inhabitants, which accounts for 3.1% of the total population of Georgia. 98% of the population is ethnic Georgian (mostly native Gurians), 1% is ethnic Armenian and the remaining 1% is composed of Russians and Ukrainians and the majority of the population is Orthodox Christians (87%), followed by Islam (11%).

Gurians

The Gurians or Gurulebi (Georgian: გურულები) is one of the ethnographical groups of Georgians, inhabiting Guria. Gurians are Orthodox Christian and speak the Gurian dialect of the Georgian language.

Politics

Administration
The administration centre is Ozurgeti.
There are 194 populated areas, including :
 City : 2 : Ozurgeti, Lanchkhuti
 Daba : 7 : Chokhatauri, Bakhmaro, Gomismta, Ureki, Naruja, Laituri, Kveda Nasakirali
 Villages : 185

Governors
To date, the following politicians have held the office of Governor of Guria:

 1995-1997 - Mikheil Chkuaseli
 1997-1998 - Oleg Nikoleishvili
 1998–2003 - Carlo Gujabidze
 2003-2004 - Vakhtang Goliadze
 2004-2005 - Bezhan Kalandadze
 2005-2006 - Aleko Tsintsadze
 2006-2008 - Mikheil Svimonishvili
 2008-2008 - Ramaz Nikolaishvili
 2008–2013 - Valeri Chitaishvili
 2013–2014 - Giorgi Chkhaidze
 2015-2017 - Gia Salukvadze
 2017-2018 - Merab Chanukvadze
 2018–present - Zurab Nasaraya

Notable people
 Ekvtime Takaishvili (1862-1952), historian.
 Noe Zhordania (1868-1953), Prime Minister of the Democratic Republic of Georgia from 1918 to 1921.
 Pavle Ingorokva (1893-1990), historian, philologist, and public benefactor.
 Boris Paichadze (1915-1990), Football Player.
 Eduard Shevardnadze (1928-2014), Georgia's former president.
 Nodar Dumbadze (1928-1984), Writer.

See also
 Subdivisions of Georgia

References

 
Regions of Georgia (country)
Historical regions of Georgia (country)